WHHV is a Southern Gospel-formatted broadcast radio station licensed to Hillsville, Virginia, serving Hillsville and Carroll County, Virginia. WHHV is owned and operated by New Life Christian Communications, Inc.

References

External links
 Victory 1400 Online

1961 establishments in Virginia
Southern Gospel radio stations in the United States
Radio stations established in 1961
HHV